Kessin is a village and a former municipality  in the district of Rostock, in Mecklenburg-Vorpommern, Germany.

History
Since 7 June 2009, it is part of the municipality Dummerstorf. Before this, it was within the Warnow-Ost Amt.

A group of West Slavic people affiliated with the Veleti tribe settled Kessini in the 8th century. Known as the Kessinians, linguistically, they belonged to the Polabian Slavs.

In popular culture
A large part of the plot of Theodor Fontane's realist novel Effi Briest takes place in a fictional town named Kessin, which is said to be in Farther Pomerania.

References

Villages in Mecklenburg-Western Pomerania